Rufus Will Granderson I (August 13, 1936 – October 20, 2015), was an American football defensive tackle who played one season with the Dallas Texans of the American Football League. He was drafted by the Detroit Lions in the nineteenth round of the 1959 NFL Draft. He played college football at Prairie View A&M University and attended Temple High School in Temple, Texas. He died in 2015 at the age of 79.

References

External links
Just Sports Stats

1936 births
2015 deaths
Players of American football from Texas
American football defensive tackles
Prairie View A&M Panthers football players
Dallas Texans (AFL) players
People from Waco, Texas
Temple High School (Texas) alumni